Sindri Fort (Sindree in old literature) was a fort lying on the Nara river, an eastern arm of the Indus River upstream of Lakhpat in the Indian state of Gujarat. It lay in the low flat region of the Rann of Kutch and was partly destroyed and submerged in an earthquake on 16 June 1819. The region where it stood subsided (sank) during the earthquake. The rapid changes in the landscape of the region were used as an example of geological change by Charles Lyell in his 1830 Principles of Geology, at a time when the Earth was seen as having been unchanged since creation.

Destruction and aftermath

Sindri fort was partly damaged by an earthquake in June 1819 and the land in the region subsided and was submerged by rushing waters. Some of the people who lived in the fort climbed up a tower and were saved by boats. A strip of land running for fifty miles and lying five miles from the fort rose up after the earthquake to form an embankment. This strip was noticed by the people at the fort and named as "Allah bund" or the mound/embankment of Allah or God. The Indus river changed its course gradually after the earthquake and cut through the newly created bund. 

Allah bund is now thought to indicate a fault line. When Alexander Burnes visited the site in 1828 he found a single tower rising above the water. The catastrophic change in the landscape was used as an example of geological change by Charles Lyell in his landmark Principles of Geology (1832). Ignatius Donnelly used the destruction and submergence of Sindri Fort as support for the possibility of Atlantis in his 1882 book Atlantis: The Antediluvian World.

References

Forts in Gujarat
Former buildings and structures in India